The All India Kisan Sabha (Akhil Bharatiya Kisan Sabha) (AIKS), or All India Kisan Sabha (36 Canning Lane), is the peasants front of Communist Party of India (Marxist), and works for farmers rights, peasants rights and anti-feudal movement in India.

It is sometimes referred to as All India Kisan Sabha (36 Canning Lane), to distinguish it from the AIKS of Communist Party of India - the AIKS (Ajoy Bhavan). All India Kisan Sabha (36 Canning Lane) was previously known as All India Kisan Sabha (Ashoka Road).

Organisation 

The address of AIKS is 36, Canning Lane, New Delhi. 
 National President: Ashok Dhawale
 National General Secretary: Vijoo Krishnan
 National Finance Secretary P. Krishna Prasad

Membership development chart 
This chart uses the Indian numeral system

Activities

Protest against three Agri-bills 
AIKS led nationwide protests against Farmers' Produce Trade and Commerce (Promotion and Facilitation) Act, 2020, Farmers (Empowerment and Protection) Agreement on Price Assurance and Farm Services Act, 2020 and Essential Commodities (Amendment) Act, 2020.

 26 January 2021: AIKS organized tractor rally in national capital.
 25 January 2021:  50,000 farmers from various regions of Maharashtra marched towards the Raj Bhavan and submitted its charter of demands to Governor Bhagat Singh Kosyari.
 24 January 2021: 20,000 farmers’ vehicle march from Golfclub Maidan in Nashik to Mumbai, Maharashtra.

Further reading 
 A History of the All India Kisan Sabha, by Md. Abdullah Rasul. Published by National Book Agency, 1974.
 All India Kisan Sabha (2 volumes), by O. P. Ralhan (ed.). Published by Anmol Publications Pvt. Ltd., 1998. .
 (pp. 1–10), by O. P. Ralhan. Published by Anmol Publications Pvt. Ltd., 2002. .

References

External links 
 AIKS Official website
 Newsreport on 2003 AIKS conference in Jullundhur
 PRESS RELEASE BY NATIONAL FARMER UNION LEADERS

Agricultural organisations based in India
Communist Party of India (Marxist)
Peasants
Rural community development